"Summer: Summer Dream / Song for You / Love in the Ice" is Tohoshinki's 12th Japanese single. It was released on August 1, 2007 and debuted at #1 on the Oricon Daily Charts, ending as #2 overall for the week. It was TVXQ's first single in Japan to reach this position on the daily charts and was considered a milestone for the Korean boyband's rising popularity in Japan. With the success of the single, TVXQ won the Gold Artist Award in Best Hits 2007 Japan on November 26.

Live performances
2007.07.28 - Music Fighter
2007.08.06 - Hey! Hey! Hey! Music Champ
2007.08.31 - a-nation 2007
2007.11.26 - Best Hits 2007 Japan
2008.07.26 - Music fair 21
2008 - T Concert Tour (several dates)
2008 - a-nation 2008 (several dates)

Track listing

CD
 "Summer Dream"
 "Song for You"
 "Love in the Ice"
 "Summer Dream" (Less Vocal)
 "Hug" (A cappella ver.)
 "Song for You" (Less Vocal)
 "Love in the Ice" (Less Vocal)

DVD
 "Summer Dream" (Video clip)
 Off Shot Movie

Music video
The music video of "Summer Dream" features the members dancing in front of a pond, also their dancing with back up dancers, as the video goes on it shows scenes where Yuchun is driving a car and collecting the members, In the end the members are seen on beach when it comes to sunset.

No music video was made for "Love in the Ice" and "Song for You".

Charts

Oricon sales chart (Japan)

Korea monthly foreign albums & singles

Korea yearly foreign albums & singles

References

External links
 http://toho-jp.net/

2007 EPs
TVXQ albums